The Young Warriors is Namibia's national U/20 football boys team. For women team, see Young Gladiators.
They have never qualified for the World Cup or Olympics.

Current squad
The following players were called up for the 2021 Africa U-20 Cup of Nations.

References

External links

https://web.archive.org/web/20120511150454/http://namibiasport.com.na/node/23667

African national under-20 association football teams
under-20